Robertas Ringys (born 2 September 1979) is a Lithuanian retired professional footballer. He played 3 games in the 2002 UEFA Intertoto Cup for FC Krylia Sovetov Samara.

External links
 

1979 births
Living people
Lithuanian footballers
Lithuanian expatriate footballers
Lithuania international footballers
FK Atlantas players
FK Žalgiris players
FBK Kaunas footballers
PFC Krylia Sovetov Samara players
FK Liepājas Metalurgs players
Expatriate footballers in Russia
Association football midfielders